Nancy Nichols Barker (1925 – 1994) was a professor of history at the University of Texas at Austin.

Early life
Barker was born on December 26, 1925, in Mt. Vernon, New York. She received a bachelor's degree at Vassar College in 1946 and master's and doctoral degrees at the University of Pennsylvania in 1947 and 1955, respectively.

Career
Barker taught briefly at the University of Delaware and joined the faculty of the University of Texas at Austin in 1955. She was a specialist in French diplomatic history.

Barker was the author of several books, including The Empress Eugenie and the Foreign Policy of the Second Empire (1967), The French Experience in Mexico, 1821-1861: A History of Constant Misunderstanding (1979), and Phillippe, Duke of Orleans (1640-1701): Brother to the Sun King (1989). She also translated and edited The French Legation in Texas (1971-1973). With Marvin L. Brown Jr., Barker edited Diplomacy in an Age of Nationalism: Essays in Honor of Lynn Marshall Case (1971).

Her work as the translator and editor of The French Legation in Texas won her the Gilbert Chinard Prize, the Summerfield G. Roberts Award, and the Award of Merit from the American Association for State and Local History. She also won the American Historical Society's Leo Gershoy Award in 1989 for Brother to the Sun King.

Barker was a member of the American Historical Association, the Society for French Historical Studies and the Western Society for French Historical Studies.

Death
Barker died on March 30, 1994, at the age of 68.

Works
 Distaff Diplomacy: The Empress Eugénie and the Foreign Policy of the Second Empire, 1967
 The French Experience in Mexico, 1821 - 1861 : A History of Constant Misunderstanding, 1979
 Brother to the Sun King : Philippe, Duke of Orléans, 1989
Translator and editor of the two-volume :
 The French Legation in Texas, 1973
Editor, with Marvin L. Brown:
 Diplomacy in an Age of Nationalism: Essays in Honor of Lynn Marshall Case, 1971

References

External links

 http://www.utexas.edu/faculty/council/2000-2001/memorials/AMR/Barker/barker.html

Vassar College alumni
University of Texas at Austin faculty
1925 births
1994 deaths
American women historians
20th-century American historians
Historians of France
Historians of Texas
University of Pennsylvania alumni
20th-century American women writers